Marko Milovanović (born 4 August 2003) is a Serbian professional footballer who plays as a forward for Spanish club Almería B.

Club career

Partizan
Born in Smederevo, Milovanović joined the youth categories of Partizan in 2010. He made his official senior debut for the first team on 17 July 2021, coming on as a substitute for Nemanja Jović in the 60th minute in a match against Proleter Novi Sad.

On 1 December 2021, Milovanović scored his first goal for Partizan against Dubočica in Serbian Cup. Five days later, he scored his first league goal in a 2-0 victory against Novi Pazar. His first European goal for Partizan came on 9 December, in a UEFA Europa Conference League draw against Anorthosis. He made total of 27 appearances and scored 3 goals for the club.

Almería
On 11 July 2022, Milovanović signed a six-year contract with Spanish La Liga side Almería.

International career
Milovanović has played internationally for Serbia at under-19 level.

References

External links
 

2003 births
Living people
People from Smederevo
Serbian footballers
Association football forwards
Serbian SuperLiga players
La Liga players
Tercera Federación players
FK Partizan players
UD Almería players
UD Almería B players
Serbia youth international footballers
Serbian expatriate footballers
Serbian expatriate sportspeople in Spain
Expatriate footballers in Spain